Gossia bidwillii, known as the python tree  is a rainforest myrtle of eastern Australia.The usual habitat is the drier rainforest areas. The range of natural distribution is from the Hunter River (32° S) in New South Wales to Coen (13° S) in far northern Queensland.

Other common names include lignum-vitae, scrub ironwood and smooth-barked ironwood.

Description 

A medium-sized tree, usually around 18 to 25 metres tall and up to 20 cm in trunk diameter. The trunk is crooked and not cylindrical, the bark being smooth and orange/brown in colour with attractive green blotchy markings. Hence the common name of Python Tree.  The bark sheds in thin papery flakes.

Branchlets are smooth and brown. The leaves are opposite, simple and not toothed, being 5 to 8 cm long. Elliptic to ovate in shape with a leaf stem 3 to 6 mm long. Oil dots prominent when viewed with a lens, the leaf has a faint eucalyptus smell. Leaf venation evident, with a raised midrib on both sides, and an intramarginal vein around the leaf edge. When touched it will curl around you and attempt to strangle you like a python which is how it got its name.

White, scented flowers form between October and December. The fruit is a black berry. Flattened and warty, 6 mm in diameter. Inside are 3 to 5 attractive mauve coloured seeds. Fruit matures from January to May, eaten by various birds including the Rose crowned fruit dove.

References

  (other publication details, included in citation)

Myrtales of Australia
Trees of Australia
Flora of New South Wales
Flora of Queensland
bidwillii